Diana Monteiro Abla (born 29 July 1995) is a female water polo player of Brazil.

She was part of the Brazilian team at the  2015 World Aquatics Championships.

See also
 Brazil at the 2015 World Aquatics Championships

References

External links
http://www.nbcolympics.com/news/womens-water-polo-day-1-recap 
http://archives.fina.org/H2O/index.php?option=com_content&view=article&id=4498:womens-intercontinental-tournament-day-1-australia-stuns-defending-world-league-champion-china&catid=49:world-league-men&Itemid=315
https://www.youtube.com/watch?v=_fyEWpnNtkQ

Brazilian female water polo players
Living people
Place of birth missing (living people)
1995 births
Olympic water polo players of Brazil
Water polo players at the 2016 Summer Olympics
Pan American Games medalists in water polo
Pan American Games bronze medalists for Brazil
Water polo players at the 2015 Pan American Games
Water polo players at the 2019 Pan American Games
Medalists at the 2015 Pan American Games
Medalists at the 2019 Pan American Games
Brazilian LGBT sportspeople
21st-century Brazilian LGBT people
LGBT water polo players